The 1st Sunday Mirror Trophy, previously known as the Glover Trophy, was a motor race, run to Formula One rules, held on 19 April 1965 at Goodwood Circuit, England. The race was run over 42 laps of the circuit, and was won by British driver Jim Clark in a Lotus 25.

Results

References
 "The Grand Prix Who's Who", Steve Small, 1995.
 "The Formula One Record Book", John Thompson, 1974.

Sunday Mirror Trophy
Glover Trophy
20th century in West Sussex
Sunday Mirror Trophy
Sunday Mirror Trophy